Faith Radio is a radio station network based in Minneapolis, Minnesota, owned and operated by University of Northwestern - St Paul and is a non-profit, listener-supported radio station relying on donations from the local community throughout the year. Faith Radio's studios are located on Snelling Avenue in St. Paul, while its transmitter is located in the Hazel Park neighborhood of Oakdale. The station broadcasts throughout the midwest.

Faith Radio (Faith Radio) and KTIS FM (98.5 KTIS) were founded in 1949 by Rev. Billy Graham when he was president of the University of Northwestern - St Paul.

Faith Radio is network whose programming features mainly Christian talk and teaching, with programs such as Susie Larson Live with Susie Larson; Focus on the Family; Family Life Today with Dave and Anne Wilson; Insight for Living with Chuck Swindoll; Living on the Edge with Chip Ingram; In Touch with Dr. Charles Stanley; and others. Programming is nearly 100 percent satellite deliverable and produced by Northwestern Media.

On February 6, 2015, Faith Radio began simulcasting on FM translator K214DF (90.7 FM), which is better received in the western(Minneapolis) suburbs, via the HD2 channel of sister station KTIS-FM (98.5 KTIS). The station added a second translator on W248CU (97.5 FM), which is better received in the eastern (St. Paul) suburbs, in June 2017, though there is significant overlap with 90.7. The second translator, licensed to Minneapolis but transmitting from St. Paul, forced a low-powered FM KPPS-LP to apply for an emergency increase in power from 50 watts to 100 watts due to interference. KPPS-LP already had an application to move to 88.9 FM however, so the request to increase power was denied by the FCC. In addition, the translator on 97.5 FM is on the same frequency as KNXR licensed to Rochester, causing some complaints from listeners in the south metro who could no longer hear the station. This is not the first time KNXR has been interfered with via a licensed broadcast station.

Faith Radio stations

Translators

References

External links 
 
University of Northwestern - St Paul | Northwestern Media

Christian radio stations in Minnesota
Radio stations in Minneapolis–Saint Paul
Radio stations established in 1949
1949 establishments in Minnesota
Northwestern Media